The 2004–05 Serie A season was the 71st season of the Serie A, the top level of ice hockey in Italy. 10 teams participated in the league, and the HC Milano Vipers won the championship by defeating SG Cortina in the final.

Regular season

Playoffs

External links
 Season on hockeyarchives.info

Serie A (ice hockey) seasons
Italy
2004–05 in Italian ice hockey